The Sitka Sentinel is an independent, family-owned newspaper published on non-holiday weekdays in Sitka, Alaska.  It was founded by Harold Veatch in 1939.  Thad and Sandy Poulson took over the paper in 1969.

The paper covers local, regional, national and international news, and includes a sports page and an end-of-week arts highlight. The paper features a news department of two reporters.

References

External links
 
 

1939 establishments in Alaska
Daily newspapers published in the United States
Independent newspapers published in the United States
Newspapers published in Alaska
Newspapers established in 1939
Sitka, Alaska